Calcium supplements are salts of calcium used in a number of conditions. Supplementation is generally only required when there is not enough calcium in the diet. By mouth they are used to treat and prevent low blood calcium, osteoporosis, and rickets. By injection into a vein they are used for low blood calcium that is resulting in muscle spasms and for high blood potassium or magnesium toxicity.

Common side effects include constipation and nausea. When taken by mouth high blood calcium is uncommon. Calcium supplements, unlike calcium from dietary sources, appear to increase the risk of kidney stones. Adults generally require about a gram of calcium a day. Calcium is particularly important for bones, muscles, and nerves.

The medical use of calcium supplements began in the 19th century. It is on the World Health Organization's List of Essential Medicines. It is available as a generic medication. In 2020, it was the 204th most commonly prescribed medication in the United States, with more than 2million prescriptions. Versions are also sold together with vitamin D. In 2020, the combination, calcium/vitamin D was the 215th most commonly prescribed medication in the United States, with more than 2million prescriptions.

Health effects

Bone health
In healthy people, calcium supplementation is not necessary for maintaining bone mineral density, and carries risks that outweigh any benefits. Calcium intake is not significantly associated with hip fracture risk in either men or women. The U.S. Preventive Service Task Force recommends against a daily supplement of calcium or vitamin D. Although a slight increase in bone mineral density occurred in healthy children from calcium supplementation, using additional dietary calcium is not justified, according to a 2006 review.

Cardiovascular impact
There is good evidence that 1,000 mg to 1,500 mg of daily calcium supplementation can effect a modest reduction in blood pressure in adults who do not have a blood pressure condition, suggesting that achieving adequate calcium levels may have role in preventing high blood pressure.

Cancer
The US National Cancer Institute does not recommend the use of calcium supplements for lowering the risk of cancer. There is weak evidence calcium supplementation might have a preventative effect against developing colorectal adenomatous polyps, but the evidence is not sufficient to recommend such supplementation.

Side effects

Excessive consumption of calcium carbonate antacids/dietary supplements (such as Tums) over a period of weeks or months can cause milk-alkali syndrome, with symptoms ranging from hypercalcemia to potentially fatal kidney failure. What constitutes "excessive" consumption is not well known and, it is presumed, varies a great deal from person to person. Persons consuming more than 10 grams/day of CaCO3 (=4 g Ca) are at risk of developing milk-alkali syndrome, but the condition has been reported in at least one person consuming only 2.5 grams/day of CaCO3 (=1 g Ca), an amount usually considered moderate and safe.

Although some studies have suggested that excessive intake of calcium in the diet or as supplements could be associated with increased cardiovascular mortality, other studies found no risk, leading a review to conclude that any risk could only be ascertained with specific further research.

Calcium supplements may contribute to the development of kidney stones.

Acute calcium poisoning is rare, and difficult to achieve without administering calcium intravenously. For example, the oral median lethal dose (LD50) for rats for calcium carbonate and calcium chloride are 6.45 and 1.4 g/kg, respectively.

Interactions 

Calcium supplements by mouth diminish the absorption of thyroxine when taken within four to six hours of each other. Thus, people taking both calcium and thyroxine run the risk of inadequate thyroid hormone replacement and thence hypothyroidism if they take them simultaneously or near-simultaneously.

Types
The intravenous formulations of calcium include calcium chloride and calcium gluconate. The forms that are taken by mouth include calcium acetate, calcium carbonate, calcium citrate, calcium gluconate, calcium lactate, and calcium phosphate.

 The absorption of calcium from most food and commonly used dietary supplements is very similar. This is contrary to what many calcium supplement manufacturers claim in their promotional materials.
 Different kinds of juices boosted with calcium are widely available.
 Calcium carbonate is the most common and least expensive calcium supplement. It should be taken with food, and depends on low pH levels (acidic) for proper absorption in the intestine. Some studies suggests that the absorption of calcium from calcium carbonate is similar to the absorption of calcium from milk.
 Antacids frequently contain calcium carbonate, and are a commonly used, inexpensive calcium supplement.
 Coral calcium is a salt of calcium derived from fossilized coral reefs. Coral calcium is composed of calcium carbonate and trace minerals. Claims for health benefits unique to coral calcium have been discredited.
 Calcium citrate can be taken without food and is the supplement of choice for individuals with achlorhydria or who are taking histamine-2 blockers or proton-pump inhibitors. Calcium citrate is about 21% elemental calcium. One thousand mg will provide 210 mg of calcium. It is more expensive than calcium carbonate and more of it must be taken to get the same amount of calcium.
 Calcium phosphate costs more than calcium carbonate, but less than calcium citrate. microcrystalline hydroxyapatite (MH) is one of several forms of calcium phosphate used as a dietary supplement. Hydroxyapatite is about 40% calcium.
 Calcium lactate has similar absorption as calcium carbonate, but is more expensive. Calcium lactate and calcium gluconate are less concentrated forms of calcium and are not practical oral supplements.

Vitamin D is added to some calcium supplements. Proper vitamin D status is important because vitamin D is converted to a hormone in the body, which then induces the synthesis of intestinal proteins responsible for calcium absorption.

Labeling
For U.S. dietary supplement and food labeling purposes, the amount in a serving is expressed in milligrams and as a percent of Daily Value (%DV). The weight is for the calcium part of the compound – for example, calcium citrate – in the supplement. For calcium labeling purposes 100% of the Daily Value was 1000 mg, but in May 2016 it was revised to 1000–1300 mg. A table of the pre-change adult Daily Values and references for the revision are provided at Reference Daily Intake. Food and supplement companies had until July 2018 to comply with the labeling change.

References

External links 
 
 
 
 

World Health Organization essential medicines
Wikipedia medicine articles ready to translate
Dietary supplements